Xiphasia setifer, the hairtail blenny or the snake blenny, is a species of combtooth blenny found in the western Pacific and Indian Oceans.  This species reaches  in SL and is the longest species of combtooth blenny.  It can also be found in the aquarium trade.

References

External links
 A Note on the Occurrence of  Xiphasia setifer (Swainson) off Mangalore, West Coast of India.

setifer
Fish described in 1839